Shuly Rubin Schwartz is the Chancellor and Irving Lehrman Research Professor of American Jewish History and Sala and Walter Schlesinger Dean of the Gershon Kekst Graduate School at The Jewish Theological Seminary of America (JTS). As Chancellor, she is the first woman elected to this position in the history of JTS.

Education 
Schwartz is a graduate of Barnard College and the Jewish Theological Seminary of America.  She wrote her Ph.D. dissertation at JTS under the direction of former Chancellor of JTS Ismar Schorsch.

Career and publications 
She has served in many leadership positions at JTS including dean of the undergraduate program, List College (1993-2018) and dean of the Graduate School (2010-2020).  She is the first female chancellor appointed to serve at JTS and was also the first woman who served as provost.

Her first published book was The Emergence of Jewish Scholarship in America: The Publication of the "Jewish Encyclopedia".  Her second book, The Rabbi's Wife: The Rebbetzin in American Jewish Life, was awarded a 2006 National Jewish Book Award. She has published other articles and editorials in anthologies and publications.

References

Living people
Jewish historians
American religion academics
Barnard College alumni
Judaic studies
Jewish Theological Seminary of America alumni
American Conservative Jews
Year of birth missing (living people)